Saban's Tenko and the Guardians of the Magic is an American animated television series that was produced by Saban Entertainment. It centers on the fictional adventures of Japanese real-life magician Princess Tenko, Mariko Itakura. After each episode, she would appear in a live-action segment to perform an illusion or do her "Teach-A-Trick," a segment that teaches the audience a simple magic trick they could perform at home. The show failed to attract an audience and production was cancelled after a single season. 

Ownership of the series passed to Disney in 2001 when Disney acquired Fox Kids Worldwide, which also includes Saban Entertainment. The series is not available on Disney+.

Plot
A young female magician, already an experienced performer, is chosen by an old man named Tenko to come to his school for magicians and learn real magic. At the school, the young magician befriends a number of other magicians already attending the school and learning magic from Tenko. The new magician begins her training and quickly becomes the best magician at the school.

Impressed by her abilities, the master names the young magician "Princess Tenko" in recognition as his successor as the next Tenko and the Master Guardian of the Tenko Box, a magical wardrobe that contains many magic gems known as the Starfire Gems. Two of the most senior students, the twins Jana and Jason watch on. Jana become jealous of the newcomer when she is chosen to become Tenko's successor and conspires for rebellion. Jason tries to talk some sense stating that unlike Jana who had slacked off during training, Mariko is more responsible and therefore Tenko could trust her. She convinces him to help her and succeed at stealing two of the Starfire Gems for their own use.

When Jana and Jason are discovered, Master Tenko is overcome by their magic. In the scuffle, the Tenko Box is damaged, and the remaining Starfire gems are scattered all over the world and some through time. The twins escape as the new Tenko arrives in an attempt to stop them. Pleased with the young magician's abilities, Master Tenko entrusts Princess Tenko and his remaining students with Starfire Gems he had hidden away and the duty of recovering and protecting the other Starfire Gems from the forces of evil.

Characters

Princess Tenko (voiced by Cree Summer): As the Master Guardian, the Japanese Tenko is the leader of the show's heroes. She performs a traveling magic show while searching for the displaced Starfire Gems. The ones she personally uses each allow her to summon a ghostly animal companion to help her battle.
Bolt (voiced by Neal McDonough): Bolt is a white Guardian from Chicago who is the team's joker. His Starfire Gem uses the power to wield a magic sword.
Hawk: Hawk is a Native American Guardian with a somewhat stereotypical connection to nature. His Starfire Gem uses the power to wield a magical shield which can block most other gems' powers.
Steel (voiced by Michael Sorich): Steel is an African-American Guardian who is a scholar of history. His Starfire Gem uses the power to fire magical rings which he can throw to capture enemies or create ladders.
Ali (voiced by Amy Danles): Ali is a hot-headed teenage white girl who feels distant from everyone in her life. After helping Tenko in one adventure, she becomes her apprentice and trains constantly to be a Guardian. In the twelfth episode, she does become a Guardian and earns her own Starfire Gem, but her power is never put to use.
Shonti: Shonti is an animal trainer hired by Hikita prior to the show. She is technically not a Guardian and does not acquire a gem within the series, but she can perform magic and is part of the team. She is from Africa, though which country is not specified. Like Hawk, she has a connection to nature.
Jana (voiced by Cree Summer): Granddaughter of the Master Guardian who came before Hikita, the short-tempered Jana tried to steal the Starfire Gems when Tenko became the new Master Guardian instead of her. It is also presumed that Jana is manipulating Jason into being loyal to her. And yet, after Vell tried to take her life away, Jana helped Tenko to seal the demon away, which means there's still a chance that she might become a guardian with her brother just like she always wanted.
Jason (voiced by Michael Sorich): Jana's twin brother. He and Tenko have shown signs of being attracted to each other, but his loyalty to his sister is greater and so he follows her orders. Unbeknownst to Jason, Jana is actually manipulating his loyalty by using their close bond to get what she wants.
Hikita Tenko: The former leader of the Guardians. After he was injured by Jana and Jason he was placed in the Tenko Box and disappeared, but occasionally his spirit appears to Princess Tenko to give her advice.
Travis Cage: An endangered-species poacher who is interested in money with each endangered animal he captures and trades. He finds the diamond Starfire Gem after failing to bag a gorilla. With the help of Jana and Jason, he kidnaps Ninjara, seeing her as a rare prey, and sets traps for Tenko and the Guardians.
Vell: An evil industrialist who was logging a rainforest to try to find the emerald Starfire Gem, which would allow him to free a demonic entity imprisoned long ago in another dimension. He is pulled into the demon's other realm for his failure and his ultimate fate is unknown.

Starfire gems and abilities
Topaz Gem – summons a Golden Lion (Holder: Princess Tenko; wears a matching armor/uniform)
Rose Quartz Gem – summons the Rose Eagle (Holder: Princess Tenko; wears a matching armor/uniform)
Sapphire Gem – lets holder breathe underwater and summon the Sapphire Dolphin (Holder: Princess Tenko; wears a matching armor/uniform)
Garnet Gem – lets the holder to wield a magic sword. (Holder: Bolt)
Turquoise Gem – gives holder a magical shield (reputedly makes them impervious to the Ruby's powers, but never demonstrated) (Holder: Hawk)
Quartz Gem – gives the holder magical rings which he/she can throw to capture enemies or create ladders (Holder: Steel)
Morganite Gem – Unknown (possibly super speed). (Holder: Ali)
Amber Gem – allows holder the power to shoot fireball projectiles (Holder: Jana)*
Ruby Gem – creates a mesmer-disk shield that lets holder hypnotize people (Holder: Jason)*
Opal Gem – Can bring inanimate objects to life. (Holder: Princess Tenko)
Amethyst Gem – Holds several animated suits of armor. (Holder: Princess Tenko)
Diamond Gem – can enlarge a creature it is used on, i.e. Ninjara. (Holder: Princess Tenko)
Pearl Gem – Has the power of flight, used by Tenko to turn her horse Pearl Rider into a pegasus. (Holder: Princess Tenko)
Onyx Gem – Lets the holder create storms, but carries a curse that if it is not given freely, its power will eventually run out of control. (Holder: Princess Tenko)
Cat's Eye Gem – Lets the user see anywhere in the world and has limited power to see the future. (Holder: Jana)*
Emerald Gem – the most dangerous Starfire Gem, allows the holder to free a demonic entity imprisoned long ago in another dimension (Holder: unknown)

Note: Jason and Jana can transform into a two-headed dragon by touching their Starfire Gems together.

Episodes

Home media
The first six episodes are available on 3 DVDs in the United Kingdom, released by Boulevard Entertainment.

Toy line tie-in
A line of Tenko toys was produced by Mattel. The dolls were slightly altered designs from the cancelled Wonder Woman and the Star Riders toy line in development during 1992–1993. Some character designs for the Tenko cartoon were based on the Star Riders character designs.

References

External links

Tenko and the Guardians of the Magic Toyguide

1990s American animated television series
1995 American television series debuts
1996 American television series endings
American children's animated action television series
American children's animated adventure television series
American children's animated fantasy television series
American television series with live action and animation
Anime-influenced Western animated television series
Cultural depictions of Japanese people
English-language television shows
Fictional stage magicians
Fictional characters who use magic
First-run syndicated television programs in the United States
Television series by Saban Entertainment